Syunik Airport  is located  east of Kapan, the sixth largest city in Armenia, and the largest city in the province of Syunik. On December 5, 2020, the Civil Aviation Committee of Armenia announced that the reconstruction of the airport was completed and flights between Kapan and Yerevan are planned to begin in the nearest future.

Syunik Airport will allow travel between Kapan and Yerevan in just 40 minutes in sharp contrast to the five hour drive. It will also serve other communities of southern Armenia.

History
The airport originally started as an airstrip in the 1940s receiving occasional flights operated by Soviet Antonov 2 aircraft. However it was only officially opened in 1972 when scheduled air services commenced. In July 1971, it was decided that the city of Kapan was in need of an air link to the capital Yerevan. However, due to the challenging topographical location of Kapan, the location was deemed too dangerous and the whole plan was cancelled. Following negotiations with the Soviet authorities and the Communist party, it was agreed that an Ilyushin Il-14 aircraft would be sent to test the airfield. In the following months, slight modifications to the runway and the installation of radio equipment were made, allowing the airfield to be operated with higher safety standards.

By mid 1972, scheduled services commenced between Yerevan and Kapan. All flights were operated by Yak-40 aircraft. Operations at Kapan Airport were quite challenging, as the published approach was for aircraft to fly into the nearby Voghji river valley, descend under the clouds and perform a left turn to line up on the runway. However, this did not hinder operations, and Kapan Airport even saw 10-12 daily flights at times.

Following the collapse of the Soviet Union in the early 1990s and the subsequent Nagorno-Karabakh War, Kapan Airport fell into disrepair.

After the 2020 Karabakh war the airport remained on Armenian side, but closer to the border separating Armenian and Azeri troops.

Ownership 
In September 2017, a 25-year concession was granted to "Syunik Airport Ltd", a company founded by the state-owned Syunik Regional Development Foundation. In May 2018 50% of it shares were transferred to the benevolent foundation of Zangezur Copper and Molybdenum Combine.

Reconstruction 
In 2013, talks to reopen the airport began between the governor of Syunik and businessmen from Armenia and abroad. Due to the dismissal of the then governor, negotiations died down, only to be restarted in 2016 and finalized in 2017, in time for the start of the construction.

About 2-km long runway is widened to 40 m and a new passenger terminal is constructed.

As of May 2019, over 800 million drams have already been invested in the project with the total budget set at around 2.3 billion drams ($5 million). As of April 2020, about 2 billion drams have already been invested in the project with the total budget raised to around 2.8 billion drams ($5.8 million).

In December 2020, the Armenian Civil Aviation Committee announced that the restoration of the airport had been completed. The runway and apron had been restored, a new terminal building constructed, and proper perimeter fencing established.

The airport is said to commence working from January 20, 2022.

See also

 List of airports in Armenia
 List of the busiest airports in Armenia
 Transport in Armenia

References

Airports in Armenia
Airports built in the Soviet Union
Buildings and structures in Syunik Province